The Brauerei Egg, Simma, Kohler GmbH & Co. KG is a brewery in Egg in Vorarlberg (Austria). It was established in 1894. The Egg Brauerei is the smallest private brewery in Vorarlberg.

The first beer was tapped in the brewery on March 24, 1894.

In addition to beer specialties, the company also produces lemonade.

During the COVID-19 pandemic, 20 out of 25 employees had to be put on Kurzarbeit. 15,000 litres of beer could not be sold and had to be destroyed.

References

External links 

 Official website 

Economy of Vorarlberg
Breweries in Austria
Beer in Austria
Austrian brands